Steve P. Zarusky (born June 20, 1943) is a former provincial level politician from Alberta, Canada. He served as a member of the Legislative Assembly of Alberta from 1986 to 1993. He is of Ukrainian descent.

Political career
Zarusky ran as a candidate for the Progressive Conservatives in the 1986 Alberta general election. He won the Redwater-Andrew electoral district defeating three other candidates including former Social Credit MLA Michael Senych. He ran for a second term in office in the 1989 Alberta general election. In that race he increased his plurality and won the district comfortably. Redwater-Andrew was abolished due to redistribution in 1993. Zarusky ran for a third term in the reconstituted Redwater electoral district. He was defeated by former Liberal leader Nicholas Taylor.

References

External links
Legislative Assembly of Alberta Members Listing

Progressive Conservative Association of Alberta MLAs
Canadian people of Ukrainian descent
Living people
People from Smoky Lake County
1943 births